The Torre Generali was a proposed supertall located in Panama City of Panama. It also would have been the tallest tower in Latin America and be the first tower there to break the  mark. The upper floors, on clear days, would have offered views of both the Pacific and Atlantic Oceans. However, the economic conditions in 2001 forced the cancellation of the project in August of that year.

Later two more projects suffered similar fates in Panama City. It began construction on July 28, 2006, but the project was later canceled.

See also
List of tallest buildings in Panama City

References

Unbuilt buildings and structures in Panama